Wirklich alles! is a live album from Christina Stürmer, released in 2005. It was recorded during a tour in Austria called Wirklich alles! during the fall of 2004, in promotion of her album Soll das wirklich alles sein.

It was not as successful as her studio albums have been.

The album was certified Platinum in Austria.

Track listing

CD 1

 Intro
 Geh Nicht Wenn Du Kommst
 Wir Halten Jetzt Die Welt An
 E.T.
 Soll Das Wirklich Alles Sein?
 Hier Bin Ich
 Disco
 Glücklich
 Weisst Du Wohin Wir Gehen?
 Rebellen Der Sonne
 Bus Durch London
 Worte In Schwarz-Weiss
 So Wie Ich Bin
 Zieh' Dir Doch Nen Anzug An
 Mehr Waffen, Mehr Feinde

CD2

 Mama (Ana Ahabak)
 Kind Des Universums
 Engel Fliegen Einsam
 Wo Ist Deine Liebe?
 Spieglein...
 Geh Raus Aus Meinem Kopf
 Märchen
 Liebt Sie Dich So Wie Ich?
 Ich Lebe
 Keine Schule
 Immer An Euch Geglaubt
 Vorbei
 Glücklich (Studio Version) (Bonus Track)

Charts

References 

Christina Stürmer albums
2005 live albums
Polydor Records live albums
German-language albums